= RATB route 105 =

The RATB route 105 Valea Oltului-Piaţa Presei Libere connects the south part of Bucharest (Ghencea-Drumul Taberei zone) with the north part (Piaţa Presei) via Gara de Nord (North Train Station). The line has more than 30 bus stations.
